Wolf D. Gruner (born 1944) is a retired German historian who held the Chair of European History, Modern and Contemporary History at the University of Rostock from 1996 to his retirement.

References

Further reading

20th-century German historians
1944 births
Living people
Academic staff of the University of Rostock